Vajebah Kaliefah Sakor (born 14 April 1996) is a professional footballer who plays as a midfielder for Italian club Triestina. Born in Liberia, he has represented Norway at youth level.

Club career
Sakor made his debut for Asker at the age of 15, becoming the youngest player to play in the Norwegian First Division. After going on trial with Milan in March 2012, Sakor signed for Juventus in January 2013.

In August 2015, Sakor joined Westerlo on loan, before joining Vålerenga on loan in March 2016.

On 31 January 2017, Sakor was loaned to Willem II until the end of the season.

On 8 February 2022, Sakor signed with Triestina in Italian third-tier Serie C.

International career
Sakor was born in Liberia and but he moved to Norway at a young age. He has represented Norway in at the U15, U16, U17, U18, U19 and most recently at the U21 level.

Career statistics

References

External links

1996 births
Living people
Liberian footballers
Liberian emigrants to Norway
People from Asker
People from Monrovia
Norwegian footballers
Norwegian people of Liberian descent
Sportspeople of Liberian descent
Norwegian expatriate footballers
Expatriate footballers in Italy
Expatriate footballers in the Netherlands
Expatriate footballers in Sweden
Expatriate footballers in Greece
Norwegian expatriate sportspeople in Italy
Norwegian expatriate sportspeople in the Netherlands
Norwegian expatriate sportspeople in Sweden
Norwegian expatriate sportspeople in Greece
Norway under-21 international footballers
Norway youth international footballers
Asker Fotball players
Vålerenga Fotball players
Willem II (football club) players
IFK Göteborg players
OFI Crete F.C. players
SK Brann players
U.S. Triestina Calcio 1918 players
Norwegian First Division players
Eliteserien players
Eredivisie players
Allsvenskan players
Super League Greece players
Serie C players
Association football midfielders